Quarterhead is a songwriting, production and artist duo from Germany started by Josh Tapen and Janik Riegert in 2010.

Career 
Originally formed as a band their international breakthrough happened in 2020 with the electronic dance song "Head Shoulders Knees & Toes" together with the French DJ duo Ofenbach and the American singer Norma Jean Martine. The song reached gold and platinum status in 10 countries and got streamed over 500 million times.

The song was written in their last session before the first lockdown of the Corona pandemic in February 2020.

Other releases include collaborations with Nelly Furtado, Cheat Codes, Hugel, Kiddo, Robin Schulz, Felix Jaehn and Sabrina Carpenter. 

In the years before the breakthrough Quarterhead wrote and produced in the background for artists like Ofenbach, Ella Henderson, LUM!X, Gabry Ponte, Dubdogz, Ilira or Benjamin Ingrosso.

The duo is currently signed to Virgin Records / Universal and Kobalt Music in London.

Discography

Singles

2016: Like I Do (feat. Jake Reese) 

 2017: Hurts So Good (mit S Y K Ë S)
 2017: Habits
 2017: I Can Sleep When I’m Dead
 2019: Comfort Zone (mit Alle Farben)
 2019: Hunter (mit Richard Judge)
 2019: Candy Shop
 2020: Head Shoulders Knees & Toes (mit Ofenbach feat. Norma Jean Martine)
 2021: Touch My Body
 2021: Eyes & You (mit Hugel)
 2021: Love So Sweet
 2021: Lucky (mit Cheat Codes & Kiddo)

Remixes 

 2018: Dan + Shay – Tequila
 2018: Backstreet Boys – Don’t Go Breaking My Heart
 2018: HUGEL & Taio Cruz – Signs
 2018: Ofenbach feat. Benjamin Ingrosso – Paradise
 2019: Robin Schulz feat. Erika Sirola – Speechless
 2021: Robin Schulz & Felix Jaehn feat. Alida – One More Time
 2021: Sabrina Carpenter – Skin
 2021: Nelly Furtado - All Good Things (Come to an End)

Songwriting & Production 

 2016: #Zwilling für Die Lochis
 2017: 365 Tage für Wincent Weiss

 2018: Paradise für Ofenbach feat. Benjamin Ingrosso
 2018: Kartenhaus für Kayef feat. Prinz Pi
 2018: Die Liebe Kommt Niemals Aus Der Mode für Michelle
 2018: Traumzone für toksï feat. Dardan
 2018: Ballons für Alexander Knappe
 2019: Alice für Jack Curley
 2019: Gold Baby für leShuuk
 2019: Diablo für ILIRA & Juan Magán
 2019: Dreamcatcher für Schiller & Jhyve
 2019: Comfort Zone mit Alle Farben
 2019: Different for Us für Alle Farben feat. Jordan Powers
 2019: Insane für Ofenbach
 2020: The Passenger für LUM!X × MOKABY & D.T.E × Gabry Ponte
 2020: Damn Damn für LeShuuk & D.T.E
 2020: Liebe & Krieg für Ela
 2020: Ehrlich Kompliziert für Ela
 2020: Sanduhr für Kaled
 2020: Head Shoulders Knees & Toes mit Ofenbach
 2020: Cookie Dough mit Dubdogz
 2021: Echo für YVES V
 2021: More Then I Can Say für Gamper & Dadoni & D.T:E
 2021: Hurricane für Ofenbach & Ella Henderson

References 

German musical duos

Musical groups established in 2010
Virgin Records artists
German songwriters